The 2015 German Open (also known as the bet–at–home Open 2015 for sponsorship reasons) was a men's tennis tournament played on outdoor red clay courts. It was the 109th edition of the German Open and part of the ATP World Tour 500 series of the 2015 ATP World Tour. It took place at the Am Rothenbaum in Hamburg, Germany, from 27 July through 2 August 2015. First-seeded Rafael Nadal won the singles title.

Points and prize money

Points distribution

Prize money

Singles main draw entrants

Seeds 

 1 Rankings are as of July 20, 2015

Other entrants 
The following players received wildcards into the singles main draw:
  Florian Mayer
  Jaume Munar
  Rafael Nadal
  Alexander Zverev

The following players received entry from the qualifying draw:
  Iñigo Cervantes
  Taro Daniel
  Albert Montañés
  Lucas Pouille

Withdrawals 
Before the tournament
  David Ferrer →replaced by  Benoît Paire
  Gilles Simon →replaced by  Aljaž Bedene

During the tournament
  Simone Bolelli (gastroenteritis)

Retirements 
  Guillermo García-López (hamstring injury)

Doubles main draw entrants

Seeds 

 Rankings are as of July 20, 2015

Other entrants 
The following pairs received wildcards into the doubles main draw:
  Philipp Kohlschreiber /  Philipp Petzschner
  Jaume Munar /  Rafael Nadal

The following pair received entry from the qualifying draw:
  Frank Moser /  Jan-Lennard Struff

Withdrawals 
During the tournament
  Simone Bolelli (gastroenteritis)
  Guillermo García-López (hamstring injury)

Finals

Singles 

  Rafael Nadal defeated  Fabio Fognini, 7–5, 7–5

Doubles 

  Jamie Murray /  John Peers defeated.  Juan Sebastián Cabal /  Robert Farah, 2–6, 6–3, [10–8]

References

External links 
  
   
 Association of Tennis Professionals (ATP) tournament profile

German Open